Paul Edward Coleman (September 25, 1915 – June 14, 1995) was an American professional basketball player. He played for the Buffalo Bisons in the National Basketball League and averaged 4.2 points per game. He earned varsity letters in soccer and basketball while attending Buffalo State College.

References

External links
 Buffalo State College Hall of Fame profile

1915 births
1995 deaths
American men's basketball players
Basketball players from Buffalo, New York
Buffalo Bisons (NBL) players
Buffalo State Bengals men's basketball players
Buffalo State Bengals men's soccer players
Guards (basketball)
Sportspeople from Buffalo, New York
Association footballers not categorized by position
Association football players not categorized by nationality